Cernăteşti may refer to several places in Romania:

 Cernătești, Buzău, a commune in Buzău County
 Cernătești, Dolj, a commune in Dolj County